We'll Meet Again is a British television drama set in the Second World War. It was produced by London Weekend Television (LWT) for the ITV network and was broadcast in early 1982 in the Friday primetime slot of 9 pm.

Plot
The show, based in a fictional village in East Anglia, was set around the clandestine and illicit love affair between civilian doctor Helen Dereham (played by Susannah York) whose husband was away fighting in Africa and the commanding officer of the nearby USAAF base, Major Jim Kiley (Michael J. Shannon).

Cast
 Susannah York as Helen Dereham  
 Michael J Shannon as Major Jim Kiley  
 Lou Hirsch as Sergeant Hymie Stutz
 Patrick O'Connell as Jack Blair  
 Lynne Pearson as Rosie Blair  
 Carolyn Pickles as Sally Bilton 
 James Saxon as Sergeant Elmer Jones  
 Gavan O'Herlihy as Captain 'Red' Berwash  
 June Barry as Vera Mundy  
 Ray Smith as Albert Mundy  
 Ronald Hines as Ronald Dereham  
 Ed Devereaux as Colonel Rufus Krasnowici  
 Christopher Malcolm as MSgt. Joe 'Mac' McGraw 
 Natalie Ogle as Letty Mundy  
 Patrick Pearson as Peter Mundy  
 Kathryn Pogson as Vi Blair  
 Lise Ann McLaughlin as Patricia Dereham
 Joris Stuyck as MSgt. Chuck Ericson
 Holly Watson as Betty Bilton
 David Baxt as Sgt. Mario Bottone
 Stuart Wilson as Sid Davis

Production
Although a major commission for LWT, the programme was planned for just one series of thirteen hour-long episodes. Production commenced in 1981 with studio scenes filmed at the South Bank Television Centre and location filming in the villages of Lenham and West Malling in the county of Kent. As was standard practice at the time, studio scenes were recorded on 2-inch quadruplex videotape with location scenes shot on 16 mm film and converted to broadcast master tape via telecine. The show was transmitted between February and May 1982. LWT had previously produced Enemy at the Door, a series about the German occupation of Guernsey during the same war, and the two series have a common theme of tension between the locals and the 'intruding' soldiers whose presence affects their ways of life, something which can become obvious when actors play similar roles in similar storylines in both series (most obviously: Ray Smith, as the father of a girl who disapproves of his daughter associating with foreign servicemen).

The show's title was based on the popular wartime song "We'll Meet Again" performed by Dame Vera Lynn. The theme for the show was composed by Denis King.  A vocal version was released as a single by Stutz Bear Cats.

Other media
Writer David Butler produced a novel called We'll Meet Again: The End of an Era that continued the story beyond the TV series.

External links
 

1980s British drama television series
1982 British television series debuts
1982 British television series endings
1980s British television miniseries
ITV television dramas
World War II television drama series
Television series by ITV Studios
London Weekend Television shows
English-language television shows